Aleksandr Vasilyevich Sukhovo-Kobylin (Moscow - , Beaulieu-sur-Mer, France), was a Russian philosopher and playwright, chiefly known for his satirical plays criticizing Russian imperial bureaucracy. His sister Evgenia Tur was a popular novelist, critic and journalist and his sister Sofia was a painter of some note.

Biography
A rich aristocrat who often travelled, Sukhovo-Kobylin was arrested, prosecuted and tried for seven years in Russia for the murder of his French mistress Louise-Simone Dimanche, a crime of which he is nowadays generally believed to have been innocent. He only managed to achieve acquittal by means of giving enormous bribes to court officials and by using all of his contacts in the Russian elite. According to his own version as well as the generally accepted view today, he was targeted precisely because he had the financial capabilities to give such bribes.

Based on his personal experiences, Sukhovo-Kobylin wrote a trilogy of satirical plays Scenes from the Past (1854–1869) about the prevalence of bribery and other corrupt practices in the absurd bureaucratical system of Russian Empire. First work of the trilogy, Krechinsky's Wedding had immediate success and became one of Russia's most frequently performed plays. The trilogy in its entirety was published in 1869. Attempts to stage the last two plays, The Trial (or The Case) and Tarelkin's Death, ran into difficulties with censorship; in particular, Tarelkin's Death was only staged in 1899. Russian literary critic Varvara Babitskaya thinks that Tarelkin's Death anticipates Franz Kafka's works and the Theatre of the Absurd.

English Translations
Krechinsky's Wedding: A Comedy in Three Acts, University of Michigan Press, [1961]. Translated by Robert Magidoff.
The Trilogy of Alexander Sukhovo-Kobylin, Dutton, 1969. (Krechinsky's Wedding, The Case, and The Death of Tarelkin). Translated by Harold B. Segel.

References

Sources 
 Гроссман Л. П. Театр Сухово-Кобылина. — Москва; Ленинград, 1940.
 Рудницкий К. Л. А. В. Сухово-Кобылин: Очерк жизни и творчества. — Москва, 1974.
 Старосельская Н. Д. Сухово-Кобылин. — Москва: Молодая гвардия, 2003. — 336 с. — (Жизнь замечательных людей.)

External links
 
 Sukhovo-Kobylin's compositions online (in Russian)

1817 births
1903 deaths
Writers from Moscow
People from Podolsky Uyezd
Russian untitled nobility
Russian dramatists and playwrights
Russian male dramatists and playwrights
19th-century dramatists and playwrights from the Russian Empire
19th-century male writers from the Russian Empire